Big Hearted Herbert is a 1934 domestic comedy film starring Aline MacMahon and Guy Kibbee as a middle-aged couple. It is based on the Broadway play of the same name by Sophie Kerr and Anna Steese Richardson, which was in turn based on the short story "Chin-Chin" by Kerr. It was remade in 1940 as Father Is a Prince.

Plot
Herbert Kalness has worked hard to build up a successful plumbing supplies manufacturing company from nothing.
His wife Elizabeth loves him dearly and is willing to put up with much. However, his grownup children, Alice and Junior, are put out by his constant complaining. Junior wants to go to college, but Herbert insists his son go to work for him in his business. Meanwhile, Alice has fallen in love with and wants to marry Andrew Goodrich, a Harvard graduate and lawyer (both qualities Herbert despises).

When Elizabeth arranges a dinner to get acquainted with the future in-laws, Herbert proceeds to antagonize everyone. So she decides to give him a taste of his own medicine. When he brings customers home for dinner, she and the rest of the family act just as obnoxiously to them as Herbert had to the Goodriches. He eventually capitulates, and domestic peace is restored.

Cast
Aline MacMahon as Elizabeth [Kalness]
Guy Kibbee as Herbert [Kalness]
Patricia Ellis as Alice [Kalness]
Helen Lowell as Martha, a servant
Phillip Reed as Andrew [Goodrich]
Robert Barrat as Jim
Henry O'Neill as Goodrich Sr.
Marjorie Gateson as Amy Goodrich
Nella Walker as Mrs. Goodrich
Junior Durkin as Junior Kalness (as Trent Durkin)
Jay Ward as Robert Kalness
Hale Hamilton as Mr. Havens
Claudia Coleman as Mrs. Havens
George Chandler as Murphy

Reception
Andre Sennwald, critic for The New York Times, called the film an "entertaining hearthside comedy" and praised Kibbee and MacMahon for their performances.

References

External links

American black-and-white films
American comedy films
Films based on multiple works
Films based on adaptations
American films based on plays
Films based on American novels
Films directed by William Keighley
Warner Bros. films
1934 comedy films
1934 films
1930s English-language films
1930s American films